Paul Demel (4 May 1903 – 31 August 1951) was an actor born in Brno, then in the Austro-Hungarian Empire. He is most notable for his cameo  appearances in films, particularly the British Ealing comedies Hue and Cry (1947), Passport to Pimlico (1949), The Lavender Hill Mob (1951) and His Excellency (1952). His other film appearances include English Without Tears (1944) for Two Cities Films. His stage work included West End roles in The Doctor's Dilemma at the Haymarket with Vivien Leigh in 1942, and Madame Louise at the Garrick in 1945. He died in Munich.

Filmography

References

External links

http://www.npg.org.uk/collections/search/person/mp55288/paul-demel
http://www.biographies.net/bio/m/0n5zyby

1903 births
1951 deaths
Actors from Brno
People from the Margraviate of Moravia
20th-century Czech male actors
Czech male stage actors
Czech male film actors
Czech male television actors